Rhamphorrhina splendens, commonly known as the regal fruit chafer, is a large beetle of the family Scarabaeidae which can grow to 30mm long.

References

Beetles of Africa
Insects of South Africa
Beetles described in 1855